Howard Chaim Cedar (Hebrew: חיים סידר; born January 12, 1943) is an Israeli American biochemist who works on DNA methylation, a mechanism that turns genes on and off.

Biography 
Howard Chaim Cedar was born in the United States. He received a bachelor's degree from Massachusetts Institute of Technology (MIT) and, in 1970, received an M.D. and a PhD from New York University. He is married to Zipora, a psychodramatist, and has six children, Joseph (a film writer and director), Dahlia, Noa, Yoav, Yonatan and Daniel, and 24 grandchildren.

Medical research career
From 1971 to 1973 he was in the U.S. Public Health Service at the National Institutes of Health in Bethesda, Maryland.

In 1973 he joined the medical school of the Hebrew University in Jerusalem, and now serves as professor emeritus in the Department for Developmental Biology & Cancer Research, The Institute For Medical Research, Israel-Canada (IMRIC).

Awards and recognition
 In 1999, Cedar was awarded the Israel Prize, for biology.
 In 2003, he became a member of the Israel Academy of Sciences and Humanities.
 In 2008, he was awarded the Wolf Prize in Medicine, jointly with Aharon Razin, "for their fundamental contributions to our understanding of the role of DNA methylation in the control of gene expression."
 In 2009, he was awarded the EMET Prize for his work in cancer research.
 In 2011 he received the Canada Gairdner International Award, together with Aharon Razin for their "pioneering discoveries on DNA methylation and its role in gene expression."
 In 2011 he received the Rothschild Prize in Biology 
 In 2016 he received the Louisa Gross Horwitz Prize together with Aharon Razin and Gary Felsenfeld.

See also 
List of Israel Prize recipients

References

1943 births
Living people
20th-century American Jews
American emigrants to Israel
Israeli Jews
American biochemists
Massachusetts Institute of Technology alumni
Academic staff of the Hebrew University of Jerusalem
Israel Prize in biology recipients
Wolf Prize in Medicine laureates
Members of the Israel Academy of Sciences and Humanities
New York University Grossman School of Medicine alumni
Bonei Zion Prize recipients
21st-century American Jews